The William Hill Sports Book of the Year is an annual British sports literary award sponsored by bookmaker William Hill. The award is dedicated to rewarding excellence in sports writing. It was first awarded in 1989, and was devised by Graham Sharpe of William Hill, and John Gaustad, founder of the Sports Pages bookshop.  As of 2020, the prize for winning the award is £30,000 and a leather-bound copy of their book. Each of the shortlisted authors receives £3,000.

Commenting on the prize's prestige, the 2005 winner Gary Imlach said "although it is a sports book prize, it has the prestige and the commercial clout to lift the winning book out of the sport section".

As of 2020, the judging panel is chaired by Alyson Rudd and includes retired professional footballer and former chairman of the Professional Footballer’s Association, Clarke Carlisle; five-time Olympic medallist and rower Dame Katherine Grainger; broadcaster and writer John Inverdale; broadcaster Danny Kelly and journalist and broadcaster Mark Lawson.

History
Paul Kimmage was the first author to win both the Irish (2011) and International awards (1990).

In 2010, Duncan Hamilton, a winner twice in the previous three years, was again included in the shortlist, although on this occasion, when the award was announced on 30 November in London, the prize was won by Brian Moore, the former England rugby union international, for his autobiography, Beware of the Dog.

In 2011, there was a "surprise inclusion" to the shortlist of Engage: The Fall and Rise of Matt Hampson, a biography of quadriplegic Matt Hampson, by 1990 winner Paul Kimmage, despite it not being included on the longlist. The shortlist also included a book on bullfighting, Into The Arena: The World of the Spanish Bullfight by Alexander Fiske-Harrison, despite journalists including Fiske-Harrison himself arguing that bullfighting was not a sport, leading to the employment of security for the first time at the ceremony at Waterstones of Piccadilly. In the end the prize went to A Life Too Short: The Tragedy of Robert Enke, about Robert Enke who committed suicide, by Ronald Reng.

Duncan Hamilton is the only author to have won the award three times, first in 2007, second in 2009 and most recently in 2019. Acclaimed boxing author Donald McRae has twice won the award, in 1996 and 2002.

Winners

References

External links
William Hill Sports Book of the Year, official website

British literary awards
Sports writing awards
Books about sports
William Hill (bookmaker)
Awards established in 1989
1989 establishments in the United Kingdom